Nadesapillai Vithyatharan (born 1959) is a Sri Lankan journalist. He is the editor of Uthayan and Sudar Oli. He has been arrested, threatened, abducted by Sri Lankan Government and backed paramilitary for his newspapers independent reporting. Uthayan has run despite severe difficulties.

Biography
Vithyatharan was born in Jaffna and was student of  Jaffna Hindu College and studied law in Colombo but had to discontinue it after the 1983 Black July riots and returned to Jaffna. He took up journalism and has been the working in the Uthayan in 1985 since its inception. Uthayan has been attacked several times and its staff killed.

He has started his own news paper Kalaikathir on 2016 after he left from Uthayan News Paper.

References

Sri Lankan Tamil journalists
Sri Lankan Tamil editors
Sri Lankan Hindus
1959 births
Living people
Alumni of Jaffna Hindu College